Dato' Lee Chee Leong (born 22 October 1957) is a Malaysian politician from the Malaysian Chinese Association (MCA). He served as one-term Member of Parliament (MP) of Malaysia for Kampar constituency in Perak, Malaysia from March 2008 to May 2013. As MP, he was twice appointed a deputy minister, first at the Ministry of Foreign Affairs from April 2008 to June 2010 and later at the Ministry of Home Affairs from June 2010 to May 2013. 

He is currently serving as the treasurer-general of MCA, having previously been in office as one of four MCA vice-presidents between 2013 and 2018. He is also chairperson of the Kedah MCA state liaison committee and MCA Kampar division.

Early life and education 
Lee was born in Ipoh, Perak and completed his GCE Advanced Level at England's Hitchin College in 1978. He graduated from Bristol Polytechnic  with a Bachelor of Arts (BA) majoring in accounting and finance in 1981. He is married to Karen Lee Sieng Shuen and has four daughters.

Political career 
Lee was elected to the Perak State Legislative Assembly in 1990, holding the seat of Tanjung Tualang and was a Perak state executive council (EXCO) member. Lee was successful in his candidacy for the parliamentary seat of Kampar in the 12th Malaysian general election and was appointed Deputy Minister of Foreign Affairs under the cabinet of Prime Minister of Malaysia, Mohammad Najib Abdul Razak, in April 2009. He was then appointed as Deputy Minister of Home Affairs in a minor cabinet reshuffle in June 2010.

After failing to retain the Kampar parliamentary seat in the 13th Malaysian general election held in 2013, Lee was nominated as one of two senators from Perak in 2014. Soon thereafter, he was sworn-in as Second Deputy Minister of International Trade and Industry on 27 June 2014.

In June 2016, prime minister Najib reshuffled his cabinet and Lee was made Deputy Minister of Finance II. He would serve in this capacity until May 2018 when the National Front (BN), together with its component parties including the MCA, was sensationally defeated in the 14th Malaysian general election. Lee failed to regain the Kampar parliamentary seat whilst suffering a decreased share of votes.

Election results

Honours 
  :
  Knight Commander of the Order of the Perak State Crown (DPMP) - Dato' (1998)

See also 
 Kampar (federal constituency)
 Malim Nawar (state constituency)

References 

Living people
Members of the Dewan Rakyat
Members of the Dewan Negara
Members of the Perak State Legislative Assembly
Malaysian people of Hakka descent
Malaysian politicians of Chinese descent
Malaysian Chinese Association politicians
Alumni of the University of the West of England, Bristol
1957 births
People from Perak